A precious metal is a naturally occurring metal of high economic value.

Precious metal may also refer to:

Precious Metal (band), an American all-female band from the 1980s featuring Janet Robin
"Precious Metal", an episode from CSI: Crime Scene Investigation (season 3)
"Precious Metals", a song by the Canadian indie pop group The Russian Futurists
Precious Metal, a 2009 book by the publishers of  Decibel magazine
Precious Metal (aircraft), a custom-built race plane based on the North American P-51 Mustang